The 2012 Rose of Tralee was the 53rd edition of the annual Irish international festival, held on 20–21 August 2012 at the Festival Dome, in Tralee, County Kerry. Dáithí Ó Sé returned as host for the third time, just a matter of weeks after marrying the 2008 New Jersey Rose, Rita Talty. 32 contestants participated in the 2012 pageant, with Nicola McEvoy, representing Luxembourg, ultimately crowned the winner. Going into the show, the Dublin and Mayo Roses were tipped as the favourites to win with McEvoy not far behind them. The background music for the event was composed by the Garda Síochána Orchestra.

The judges for the 2012 Rose of Tralee were; RTÉ's Mary Kennedy, Michael Kearney, CAO of The Carlton Hotel Group, Denise Murphy O'Sullivan, the 1991 Rose of Tralee, Paul Neeson, Retail Director of Dublin Airport Authority, Jan Dowling, Motivation Weight Management and Tom Curran, Kerry County manager.

Ireland and Munster rugby player Ronan O'Gara was present on the final night and presented the winning Rose with her sash and tiara. Irish band The Coronas also performed their song "Addicted to Progress" during the show.

2012 was the first year that the Denver Rose and the Tyrone Rose made it onto the televised Rose Selection.

List of Roses

A. Each Rose is accompanied by an Escort whose job it is to look after their Rose and to ensure that her time at the Festival is a memorable and enjoyable experience. Every year the Roses & the Escorts vote on who they believed was the best Escort throughout the festival, the person with the most votes is then crowned Escort of the Year.

Broadcasting
The 2012 Rose of Tralee was broadcast live on RTÉ One and it was also streamed live on the RTÉ website for viewers all over the globe. The show received an audience share of 45%, the first time the audience share has dipped below 50% since 2008.

References

Rose of Tralee
Rose of Tralee